Isogenus nubecula is a species of insect belonging to the family Perlodidae.

It is native to Europe.

References

Plecoptera
Insects described in 1833